St. Adalbert's Church referred to in Polish as 'Kościół Świętego Wojciecha', is a Roman Catholic Parish located at 1923 W. Becher St on Milwaukee's South Side, and one of Milwaukee's 'Polish Cathedrals.

Dedication
See Adalbert of Prague, Czech / Polish martyr and saint of the Roman Catholic Church.

History
With the need for additional churches exploding on Milwaukee's South Side, five lots were purchased on the corner of Becher and South 19th street on June 23, 1908. Two months later the cornerstone was laid and blessed under the guidance of Rev. Michael Domachowski was also named as the first parish priest.

On February 28, 1909, the church and its adjoining school were blessed and completed later that year. The students were taught by the School Sisters of Notre Dame.  On September 18, 1909 Domachowski was followed by another priest Wacław (Wenceslaus) Kruszka fresh from his extensive “exile” in Ripon. He was elated to finally have a Milwaukee parish, which had been brokered by the Polish bishop in Chicago, Auxiliary Bishop Paul Peter Rhode.

Father Kruszka brought love and passion to his parish. The adjoining school reached its peak enrollment by 1924, when 1,585 pupils were taught by 23 sisters. Due to growing attendance and the popularity of the pastor, the parish decided to build a new church at a cost of $252,000 on land donated by St. Hyacinth’s parish. On April 23, 1931 the church was completed and blessed.

During the time, Father Kruszka was also instrumental in organizing the new Blessed Sacrament Parish on 41st and Oklahoma Streets.

Architecture
The church is the city’s only example of Polish-inspired Romanesque Revival architecture. The tall tower on the northwest corner of the church was built to resemble that of Wawel Cathedral in Cracow, Poland. The copper clad belfry holds four bells with the names of St. Adalbert, Jesus, Mary, and the Angel inscribed on them. The church became well known in the Milwaukee area for its beautiful stained glass windows.

See also
Wacław Kruszka
Alan Kulwicki (buried in the church's cemetery)

Sources
Borun, Thaddeus, We, the Milwaukee Poles (Milwaukee: Nowiny Publishing Co. 1946)

External links
The Polish Churches of Milwaukee

Roman Catholic churches in Milwaukee
Polish-American culture in Milwaukee
Landmarks in Wisconsin
Polish Cathedral style architecture